Prison Nurse is a 1938 American drama film directed by James Cruze and written by Earl Felton and Sidney Salkow. It is based on the 1934 novel Prison Nurse by Louis Berg. The film stars Henry Wilcoxon, Marian Marsh, Bernadene Hayes, Ben Welden, Ray Mayer and John Arledge. The film was released on March 1, 1938, by Republic Pictures.

Plot
A typhoid fever breaks out in a state prison and the prison's only doctor gets sick, there are only 3 nurses at the prison to administer vaccines and take care of the inmates, but some are planning to use the chaos to escape.

Cast 
Henry Wilcoxon as Dale
Marian Marsh as Judy
Bernadene Hayes as Pepper Clancy
Ben Welden as Gaffney
Ray Mayer as Jackpot
John Arledge as Mousie
Addison Richards as Warden Benson
Frank Reicher as Doctor Hartman
Minerva Urecal as Sutherland
Selmer Jackson as Parker
Fred Kohler Jr. as Miller
Norman Willis as Deputy

References

External links
 

1938 films
1930s English-language films
American drama films
1938 drama films
Republic Pictures films
Films directed by James Cruze
American black-and-white films
1930s American films